Silesian dialect may refer to:

 Silesian Polish, or Upper Silesian, a dialect of the Polish language
 Silesian German, or Lower Silesian, a nearly extinct dialect of East Central German
 Lach dialects, or Silesian Czech